The Temple News (TTN) is the editorially independent weekly newspaper of Temple University.
It prints 6,000 copies to be distributed primarily on Temple's Main Campus every Tuesday. A staff of 25, supported by more than 150 writers, is responsible for designing, reporting and editing the 20-page paper. Increasingly, TTN is supplementing its weekly print product with breaking news and online-only content on its web site. In September 2007, TTN launched Broad & Cecil, its own blog community.

In 2010, the paper's efforts garnered seven Keystone Press Awards. The previous year, the paper's staff won eight Keystones. In November 2008, the paper's web site, temple-news.com, was honored with the 2008 National Online Pacemaker Award, and has also won the print counterpart, a National Pacemaker Award, both awarded by the Associated Collegiate Press.

History
Temple University Weekly first appeared on Monday, Sept. 19, 1921. It was led by an alumni editor and fully supported by the university, though student writers were responsible for coverage.

Beginning in the 1930s and continuing into the 1950s, with exceptions during World War II, the now-labeled Temple University News printed Mondays, Wednesdays and Fridays. During the 1960s and 1970s, the paper went daily, before dropping to four days per week in the 1980s. In the early 1990s, TTN was the fourth largest daily newspaper in Philadelphia. In the late 1990s, citing declining ad revenue and staff size, the paper returned to its weekly origins. With the exception of a single semester in 2005, TTN has been weekly ever since. TTN also publishes daily online content.

Contrary to industry trends, The Temple News had a renaissance in staff numbers and interest in its content in the twenty-first century. The publication did not create its website until 1998, and it did not have its own domain name until 2003.

TTN has made significant progress in the sphere of internet journalism despite its modest start. It has been a perennial nominee for the Associated Collegiate Press's Online Pacemaker[4] award, which it won in 2008. At the moment, the paper is powered by WordPress.

In January 2009,[5] a newly designed website premiered, offering content available exclusively online and a rising multimedia presence, including photo galleries, audio, and video.

In the summer of 2012, the site was revamped in its current configuration. The Temple News provides complimentary printed copies to all students, professors, and staff. Its present format is designed to make it more interesting for its target audience. The site features breaking news, editorials, podcast episodes, and a variety of other topics.

Production
In a given Temple News production week, articles and graphics are typically assigned during Monday budget meetings for the following week's Tuesday printing. Features and editorial content are typically deadlined on Thursday, to be fact-checked and corrected by section editors and copy editors.

While both the news and sports sections have moved away from including breaking news in its print product — opting for an online venue — these sections typically allow for deadlines on Monday production nights.

Awards
The Temple News has been honored with numerous awards in the past few years, beginning with the Keystone Press Awards in February 2006. TTN editors, reporters and photographers have won Keystone Press Awards in every year since. In 2009, staff members won awards for ongoing news coverage, public service/enterprise package, news photos, sports photos, photo story and web site.

The Temple News Online is a finalist in the 2009 Online Pacemaker competition by the Associated Collegiate Press. The results will be announced in October 2009 at the ACP/CMA National College Media Convention in Austin.

Most recently, TTN Online earned an EPpy Award for the Best College Newspaper Web Site in the country. The award is given by Editor & Publisher and Mediaweek magazines.  In February 2014, The Temple News won 17 Keystone Press Awards.

Notable alumni
Bill Conlin, 1960 (TTN Editor-in-Chief), Philadelphia Daily News sports columnist
Phil Jasner, 1964-1966 (TTN sports writer), Philadelphia Daily News 76ers beat writer
Tom Ferrick, 1968* (TTN Editor-in-Chief), retired Philadelphia Inquirer columnist; 1979 Pulitzer Prize for Breaking News *Did not graduate
Chuck Darrow, 1977 (TTN Editor-in-Chief), Philadelphia Daily News casino columnist
Nancy E. Krulik, 1983 (TTN news editor), three time New York Times bestseller and creator of the Katie Kazoo and How I Survived Middle School book series
Clarence Williams, 1987 (TTN photographer), Los Angeles Times photographer; 1998 Pulitzer Prize for Feature Photography
John Finger, 1994 (TTN sports editor), Comcast Sports Net, CSNPhilly.com
Damian J. Holbrook, 1994 (TTN entertainment editor), TV Guide senior writer
E. Martin Hulse, 1995 (TTN Editor-in-Chief), Lancaster New Era features editor; York Daily Record food editor/features designer; Delaware State News reporter/copy editor/designer
Paul Zeise, 1997 (TTN Opinion editor), Pittsburgh Post-Gazette sports writer
Kevin Negandhi, 1997 (TTN Sports editor), ESPN contributing anchor
Kristen Graham, 2000 (TTN staff writer), Philadelphia Inquirer education reporter; 2012 Pulitzer Prize for Public Service
Tracy Davidson, 2006 (TTN staff writer), WCAU co-anchor
Brian James Kirk, 2008 (TTN columnist), Technically Media co-founder
Kurtis Lee, 2009 (TTN staff writer), Denver Post reporter; 2013 Pulitzer Prize for Breaking News

References

External links
The Temple News Online
Broad & Cecil, the blog of The Temple News

Student newspapers published in Pennsylvania
Temple University
Newspapers published in Philadelphia